Gustavo Daniel Lemos (born 24 March 1996) is an Argentinian professional boxer.

Professional boxing career
Lemos made his professional debut against Lucio Alberto Ayala on 7 May 2016. He won the fight by unanimous decision. Lemos amassed a 13–0 record during the next two years, before being booked to face Ruben Dario Lopez for the vacant IBF Latino super lightweight belt on 26 January 2018, the first major regional title of his career. He won the fight by a fourth-round knockout. Lemos made his first title defense against Damian Leonardo Yapur on 24 March 2018. He won the fight by a fifth-round knockout. He was deducted a point in both the fourth and fifth rounds for low blows.

Lemos next moved down to lightweight, in order to challenge the IBF Latino lightweight champion Miguel German Acosta on 21 July 2018. He won the fight by a third-round technical knockout. Acosta was knocked down twice before the stoppage, once in the second and once in the third round. Lemos made his first title defense against Nestor Armas on 24 August 2018. He knocked Armas down in the opening round, before knocking him out in the fourth round. Lemos faced Uriel Perez in a non-title bout on 13 October 2018, in his final fight of the year. He won the fight by unanimous decision, with scores of 96–93, 98–91 and 99–90.

Lemos made his second Latino lightweight title defense against Galvis Guerra on 12 January 2019. He won the fight by a fourth-round knockout, after knocking Guerra down twice in the fourth round prior to the knockout. Lemos then faced the experienced Jorge Paez Jr in a non-title bout on 30 March 2019. He won the fight by a second-round knockout. Lemos made his third Latino title defense against Pedro Verdu on 18 May 2019. He won the fight by a fifth-round technical knockout.

Lemos faced Jonathan Jose Eniz for the vacant IBF Youth lightweight title on 23 August 2019. He won the fight by a third-round technical knockout. Lemos made the first defense of his newly acquired title against Yeison Gonzalez on 23 November 2019. He won the fight by a second-round technical knockout.

Lemos returned from a thirteen-month absence from the professional competition to face Jakmani Hurtado for the vacant IBF Latino super lightweight title on 18 December 2020. He won the fight by a second-round technical knockout. Lemos made his first Latino super lightweight title defense against Demian Daniel Fernandez on 20 February 2021. He made quick work of his opponent, as he won by a first-round technical knockout. Lemos made his second title defense against Maximiliano Ricardo Veron on 17 April 2021. He won the fight by an eight-round technical knockout.

Lemos was booked to face the former IBF featherweight champion Lee Selby in an IBF lightweight title eliminator on 26 March 2022, at the Estadio Luna Park in Buenos Aires, Argentina. He won the fight by a fifth-round technical knockout. Selby was knocked down twice prior to the stoppage, once in the fourth and once in the fifth round.

Professional boxing record

References

Living people
1996 births
Argentine male boxers
Boxers from Buenos Aires
Lightweight boxers
Light-welterweight boxers